The Women's trap event at the 2020 Summer Olympics  took place on 28 and 29 July 2021 at the Asaka Shooting Range.

Records

Prior to this competition, the existing world and Olympic records were as follows.

Schedule
All times are Japan Standard Time (UTC+9)

Results

Qualification

Final

References

Shooting at the 2020 Summer Olympics
Women's events at the 2020 Summer Olympics
Olympics